The 2016 FIBA U20 Women's European Championship was the 15th edition of the Women's U-20 European basketball championship. 16 teams participated in the competition, which was played in Matosinhos, Portugal, from 9 to 17 July 2016.

Spain won their sixth gold in the competition history, beating Italy in the final 71–69.

Venues
Centro de Desportos e Congressos, Matosinhos
Pavilhao Municipal de Guiföes, Matosinhos
Custoias Arena, Custoias

Participating teams

  (Winners, 2015 FIBA Europe Under-20 Championship for Women Division B)

  (Runners-up, 2015 FIBA Europe Under-20 Championship for Women Division B)

  (3rd place, 2015 FIBA Europe Under-20 Championship for Women Division B)

Preliminary round
In this round, the 16 teams are allocated in four groups of four teams each. All teams advance to the playoff round of 16.

Group A

Group B

Group C

Group D

Final round

Bracket

Classification

5th–8th place classification

9th–16th place classification

Final standings

Awards

All-Tournament Team
  Aleksandra Crvendakić
  Raisa Musina 
  Julie Allemand 
  Laura Quevedo 
  Cecilia Zandalasini

References

External links
FIBA official website

2016
2016–17 in European women's basketball
2016–17 in Portuguese basketball
International women's basketball competitions hosted by Portugal
International youth basketball competitions hosted by Portugal
Sport in Matosinhos
FIBA
2016 in youth sport